Police FC is a Guyanese football club in Georgetown. The club competes in the GFF Elite League, the top league of football in Guyana.

References

Football clubs in Guyana
Police association football clubs